The Diary (often referred to as the Secret Diary or Cipher Diary) was written in 1835 by Karel Hynek Mácha, the best-known Czech romantic poet. After deciphering of the parts recorded in code, there was a discussion of the decision to publish the author's private affairs.

Contents 

Deciphering 
The cipher was first decoded by Jakub Arbes, who borrowed two pages from Umělecká Beseda institute in 1884 and published his results in Rozhledy literární magazine in 1886. 38 different ciphers were used 4,421 times altogether in the extant manuscript. The cipher was complicated by using both Czech and German language, and writing every second line from right to left.

Controversy and publishing 
Jakub Arbes was the first to read the text of the cipher passages and to recommend not publishing all of it, because "some parts concerning most delicate matters are not advisable to be published". The question of publishing was opened on the occasion of the celebration of the poet's centenary in 1936. A group of surrealists and linguists (Roman Jakobson, Karel Teige, Vítězslav Nezval, and Bohuslav Brouk) argued against the poet's false cult and for publishing the secret parts of the diary. The complete text was not published until the 1970s (but not officially in Czechoslovakia), and it was widely distributed in the 1980s. The correctly decoded and critically analysed text was first published in 2007.

Context 
In 1986 Pushkin's Secret Journal 1836–1837 was published which has very erotic contents. 

At the end of the 19th century, Journal Intime by Benjamin Constant was first published.

References 

Diaries
Czech books
Works by Karel Hynek Mácha